Tricholoma imbricatum is a species of agaric fungus in the family Tricholomataceae. Commonly known as the matt knight, it is found in Europe and North America, where it grows on the ground in coniferous forests. The gills are initially whitish in color before developing reddish-brown spots. The spores are white.

The species may be edible, but has an unpalatable tough texture.

Similar species include Tricholoma dryophilum, T. fracticum, T. manzanitae, and T. vaccinum. Others, which have viscid caps and are usually found in other environments, include T. muricatum, T. ustale, T. populinum.

See also
List of North American Tricholoma
List of Tricholoma species

References

imbricatum
Fungi described in 1815
Fungi of Europe
Taxa named by Elias Magnus Fries